Oaphantes is a genus of North American dwarf spiders that was first described by Ralph Vary Chamberlin & Vaine Wilton Ivie in 1943.

Species
 it contains three species:
Oaphantes cryophilus Paquin, Dupérré, Buckle & Ubick, 2020 – Canada, USA
Oaphantes pallidulus (Banks, 1904) – USA
Oaphantes prometheus Paquin, Dupérré, Buckle & Ubick, 2020 – Canada, USA

See also
 List of Linyphiidae species (I–P)

References

Linyphiidae
Monotypic Araneomorphae genera
Spiders of the United States